Dichelacera is a genus of horse flies in the family Tabanidae.

Species

Dichelacera abbreviata Philip, 1968
Dichelacera adusta Wilkerson, 1981
Dichelacera albifasciata Fairchild & Philip, 1960
Dichelacera albitibialis Burger, 1999
Dichelacera albomarginata (Kröber, 1930)
Dichelacera alcicornis (Wiedemann, 1828)
Dichelacera almeidai Lima, Krolow & Henriques, 2018
Dichelacera amazonensis Henriques, 1994
Dichelacera ambigua (Lutz & Neiva, 1914)
Dichelacera amilcar Fairchild, 1964
Dichelacera anodonta Burger, 1999
Dichelacera antunesi Fairchild & Philip, 1960
Dichelacera apicalis (Fairchild, 1939)
Dichelacera aurata Wilkerson, 1979
Dichelacera auristriata Burger, 1999
Dichelacera bifacies Walker, 1848
Dichelacera bolviensis (Brèthes, 1910)
Dichelacera callosa Lutz, 1915
Dichelacera caloptera Hine, 1920
Dichelacera cervicornis (Fabricius, 1805)
Dichelacera chocoensis Fairchild & Philip, 1960
Dichelacera cnephosa (Barretto, 1947)
Dichelacera corumbaensis Barros & Gorayeb, 1995
Dichelacera costaricana (Fairchild, 1941)
Dichelacera crocata Fairchild, 1953
Dichelacera damicornis (Fabricius, 1805)
Dichelacera deliciae Fairchild & Philip, 1960
Dichelacera diaphorina (Barretto, 1947)
Dichelacera dorotheae Fairchild & Philip, 1960
Dichelacera fairchildi Burger, 1999
Dichelacera fasciata Walker, 1850
Dichelacera flavescens (Thunberg, 1827)
Dichelacera flavicosta Wilkerson, 1981
Dichelacera fuscinervis (Barretto, 1950)
Dichelacera fuscipes Lutz, 1915
Dichelacera gamma (Kröber, 1931)
Dichelacera grandis Ricardo, 1904
Dichelacera hartmanni Fairchild & Philip, 1960
Dichelacera hubbelli Fairchild & Philip, 1960
Dichelacera imfasciata Fairchild & Philip, 1960
Dichelacera intermedia Lutz, 1915
Dichelacera januarii (Wiedemann, 1819)
Dichelacera lamasi Penaforte & Henriques, 2019
Dichelacera leucotibialis (Barretto, 1947)
Dichelacera marginata Macquart, 1847
Dichelacera melanoptera Hine, 1920
Dichelacera melanosoma Hine, 1920
Dichelacera mexicana Fairchild & Philip, 1960
Dichelacera micracantha Lutz, 1915
Dichelacera modesta Lutz, 1915
Dichelacera multiguttata Lutz, 1915
Dichelacera nigricorpus (Lutz, 1915)
Dichelacera nubiapex Fairchild & Philip, 1960
Dichelacera nubipennis Rondani, 1868
Dichelacera ochracea Hine, 1920
Dichelacera paraensis Henriques, 1994
Dichelacera parvidens (Enderlein, 1925)
Dichelacera princessa Fairchild & Philip, 1960
Dichelacera pulchra Williston, 1901
Dichelacera pulchroides Fairchild & Philip, 1960
Dichelacera pullata Fairchild & Philip, 1960
Dichelacera regina Fairchild, 1940
Dichelacera rex Fairchild, 1951
Dichelacera rubricosa (Wulp, 1881)
Dichelacera rubrofemorata Burger, 1999
Dichelacera scapularis Macquart, 1847
Dichelacera scutellata Williston, 1895
Dichelacera serrata Fairchild & Philip, 1960
Dichelacera steleiothorax (Barretto, 1947)
Dichelacera striata Henriques, 1994
Dichelacera subcallosa Fairchild & Philip, 1960
Dichelacera submarginata Lutz, 1915
Dichelacera t-nigrum (Fabricius, 1805)
Dichelacera tenuicornis (Lutz, 1915)
Dichelacera tetradelta Henriques, 1994
Dichelacera transposita Walker, 1854
Dichelacera trigonifera (Schiner, 1868)
Dichelacera trisulca Fairchild & Philip, 1960
Dichelacera unifasciata Macquart, 1838
Dichelacera varia (Wiedemann, 1828)
Dichelacera variegata Burger, 1999
Dichelacera villavoensis Fairchild & Philip, 1960
Dichelacera walteri Guimarães, Gorayeb & Rodrigues-Guimarães, 2015

References 

Tabanidae
Brachycera genera
Diptera of North America
Diptera of South America
Taxa named by Pierre-Justin-Marie Macquart